Bu Hua (born 1973) is a digital artist based in Beijing, China, best known for her flash animation works.

Early life and education
Bu was born in 1973. The daughter of a well-known printblock artist, Bu had an early introduction to art and in 1983, when only 10 years old, her painting Sun Bird Flower and I was selected by the China Post and issued as a stamp as part of a "children's paintings election" (special stamp T86). Following just a few years later in 1985, the Hong Kong Arts Centre hosted a small exhibition wall of Bu's work.

Career 
Although Bu majored in painting while at university, she discovered her passion for animation through her interest in film, and found that "Flash can help people realize their dream of being a filmmaker."  An early adopter and pioneer of using Flash Animation, Bu's Cat animation went viral upon its release in 2002.

Influenced by seeing the work of William Kentridge while in Germany, she hoped to similarly combine drawing, painting and animation. In recent years she has developed a central character to a number of her video and illustrative works, based on Bu as a child. Through the perspective of this alter ego figure, her work explores the tulmultuous social landscape. “In modern China, how could you not be influenced by this fusion of West and East, this cultural invasion and ‘soft power’? I am just reflecting this reality."

Works 
 Cat (2002), Flash
 Savage Growth (2008), Flash
 Maomao's Summer 
 Wisdom, Picture book, 
 The Best Has Already Come (2017)

References 

1973 births
Living people
Artists from Beijing
20th-century Chinese women artists
20th-century Chinese artists
21st-century Chinese women artists
21st-century Chinese artists
Tsinghua University alumni